The Shandong University of Science and Technology (SDUST) is a public university in Shandong province, China. It was established in 1951. The university offers courses in science and technology.

Campus

The university's main campus has been in Qingdao since 2003. It has regional campuses in Tai'an and Jinan. The total area of the university is 243.16 hectares with a floor space of 1.35 million square meters. More than 44,600 students were enrolled in 2010.

Administration

Departmental structure
President Office
International Office
Department of Academic Affairs
Department of Scientific Research
Department of Student Affairs
Department of Human Resource
Department of Finance
Department of Assets Management
School of Graduate
General Scientific Corporation

Faculty structure
The Shandong University of Science and Technology is made up of sixteen academic colleges, nine departments and one independent college. There are five postdoctoral research stations, three level-1 doctoral programs with 24 disciplines conferring doctor's degrees, seven disciplines with Taishan Scholar professors of Shandong province, twelve level-1 master's degree programs with 77 disciplines conferring master's degrees, fourteen domains conferring Master of Engineering degrees, and 72 undergraduate programs.

It has one state key discipline, 27 key disciplines (laboratories), one provincial research base for humanities and social sciences, one Qingdao City key laboratory, one engineering research center of the Ministry of Education, seven provincial research centers of engineering and technology.

There is a professional center with an approval of the National Manufacturing Information Training Center, a foreign language training center under the State Administration of Foreign Experts Affairs, Shandong—Russia Center of Scientific Cooperation, and the Qingdao Manufacturing Information Personnel Cultivation Base. The Russian Academy of Natural Sciences set up a China Science Center at the university.

College of Natural Resources and Environmental Engineering
College of Geosciences and Technology
College of Civil Engineering and Architecture
College of Mechanical and Electronic Engineering
College of Computer Science and Engineering
College of Economics and Management
College of Information and Electrical Engineering
College of Chemical and Environmental Engineering
College of Materials Science and Engineering
College of Humanities and Law
College of Foreign Languages
College of Science
College of Continuing Education
Taishan College of Science and Technology
College of Geomatics
College of Arts and Design

Notable alumni
Eric Yuan – Founder and CEO of Zoom Video Communications.

References

External links 

 
1951 establishments in China
Educational institutions established in 1951
Technical universities and colleges in China
Universities and colleges in Qingdao